Bukari Kpegla Adama (15 November 1925 – 2 November 2003) was a Ghanaian politician and a minister of state in the Second Republic.

Early life and education
He was born at Busa, in the Wa district, on 15 November 1925. He attended Wa Native Authority Primary Boarding School in 1934, completing in 1939; and Tamale Government Middle Boarding School, Tamale from 1940 to 1943. He proceeded to the Tamale Government Training College, Tamale and subsequently left in 1944 to join the Medical Field Unit (M.F.U.) as a technician specialising in yaws and typhoid. He resigned in that same year to go into active politics.

Politics
He stood for the seat of Wala South constituency in the Legislative Assembly and won on the Northern Peoples Party (NPP) ticket in June 1954.
He was in the opposition and remained the "Chief Whip" in Parliament until 1965 when Ghana became a one party state. He was not re-elected, because he refused to join the party in power. In 1957 when the Avoidance of Discrimination act was passed he played a leading role in the merger between the Northern People's Party (NPP) and the National Liberation Movement (NLM) that formed the United Party (UP) as an executive member of the Northern People's Party (NPP). In May 1957, he went to the United Kingdom to do a course in Parliamentary Practice in Westminster, London. In October 1960 he was a member of the "Ghana delegation" to the Nigerian Independence celebrations. In 1965 he went into voluntary exile for four months before the 1966 coup in February. He returned to Ghana after the 1966 coup d'état, and in December 1968 he was elected to the constituent assembly for the Wa Administrative District. In 1969 he was elected as a parliamentary member representing Wala South, he served in this capacity until 1972. He was appointed Minister of Parliamentary Affairs in 1969 and later Defence Minister in 1971 serving in the Busia Administration until Col. I. K. Acheampong's coup d'état of 13 January 1972. In 1979 during the inception of the Third Republic he contributed to deliberations that led to the formation of the Popular Front Party (PFP) and also the New Patriotic Party (NPP) in 1993.

Personal life
He married Memuna Mansara Braimah in 1949 and Mansara al Hassan in 1963.
His hobbies included reading novels. He is a Muslim.

Death
He died on Sunday, 2 November 2003 at the 37 Military Hospital after a short illness.

See also
Busia government
List of MPs elected in the 1969 Ghanaian parliamentary election

References

1925 births
2003 deaths
Popular Front Party politicians
New Patriotic Party politicians
Ghanaian Muslims
Ghanaian MPs 1954–1956
Ghanaian MPs 1956–1965
Ghanaian MPs 1969–1972
Defence ministers of Ghana
Progress Party (Ghana) politicians